"This Is Your Night" is a song by American rap group Heavy D & the Boyz. It was written by Heavy D and Teddy Riley for their fifth and final studio album, Nuttin' But Love (1994), with production helmed by the latter. The song contains elements from "Ladies' Night" (1979) by American R&B band Kool & the Gang and also samples George Benson's "Give Me the Night" (1980). Released in 1994 as the album's third international single, it reached the top 20 in France and the Netherlands.

Critical reception
In his weekly UK chart commentary, James Masterton described the song as "another rapped up version of a disco classic".

Charts

Release history

References

Heavy D songs
1994 singles
1994 songs
MCA Records singles
Song recordings produced by Teddy Riley
Songs written by Teddy Riley
Uptown Records singles